Travancore Devaswom Board is statutory and autonomous body managing around 1200 temples in southern part of India. The regular operations of one of the major temples of India, Sabarimala temple, works under its guidance.

History and Administration 

Travancore Devaswom Board is the administrative body created for managing around 1200 temples in South India. The management of one of the famous temples, Sabarimala, is under it.

Roles and Responsibilities 

Travancore Devaswom Board is formed with below purpose

 Pilgrim welfare.
 Maintain properties of temple.
 Development of areas in and around temple.
 Welfare of staff working in temples managed by it.
 Purchase of temple ritual items.
 Offering guidelines on sacred Prasadam prepared at temples managed by it.
 Representing temple in court in all legal matters.

Composition 

Travancore Devaswom Board is headed by Senior CPM leader K Ananthagopan.

See also 

 Devaswom boards in Kerala

References

External links 
 Official Website

Sabarimala
Hindu organisations based in India